The  Edmonton Eskimos season was the 59th season for the team in the Canadian Football League and their 68th overall. The Eskimos finished in 4th place in the West Division with a 10–8 record, and qualified for the playoffs via the "crossover" rule. The Eskimos attempted to repeat as Grey Cup champions. This will be the first season under head coach Jason Maas and fourth under general manager Ed Hervey.

The Eskimos qualified for the playoffs for the third straight season following losses by the Toronto Argonauts and Montreal Alouettes during their week 17 bye.

Offseason

CFL draft
The 2016 CFL Draft took place on May 10, 2016.

Notable transactions

Preseason

Regular season

Season standings

Season schedule

Total attendance: 278,982 
Average attendance: 30,998 (55.1%)

Post-season

Schedule

Team

Roster

Coaching staff
Head coach
Head coach – Jason Maas
Assistant head coach – Mike Benevides

Offensive coaches
Offensive line/run game coordinator – Mike Gibson
Receivers coach – Carson Walch
Quarterbacks / pass game coordinator – Jordan Maksymic
Running backs – Tim Prinsen

Defensive coaches
Defensive coordinator – Mike Benevides
Linebackers – Demetrious Maxie
Defensive backs/player development – Barron Miles
Defensive line – Casey Creehan

Special teams coaches
Special teams coordinator – Cory McDiarmid

References

2016 Canadian Football League season by team
Edmonton Elks seasons
Edmonton Eskimos